Steady as She Goes is a 2011 album by Hot Tuna, the band's first studio album since 1990.  After Jorma Kaukonen recorded his solo album in 2009 at Levon Helm's studio in NY, he asked his new record company Red House if they would be interested in a Tuna album.  The band started recording new tracks in November 2010 with the same producer and studio that Kaukonen used for River of Time and features the latest lineup of the band that formed in 2009 when Skoota Warner joined on drums.  On March 11, 2011, Red House released Angel of Darkness as a free single.  The album was released on CD and on iTunes April 5, 2011 and was released on vinyl in May.  The album first charted on the Tastemaker and Independent album lists compiled by Billboard for the week of April 23.

Released as "Collector's Edition: Half-speed Mastered 180 Gram HQ Vinyl" with only a few hundred made, in gatefold form and including a Hot Tuna tattoo, as well as the CD version, it includes two LPs, with an etched portrait on side four. Each side without the etching has four songs.

Recording
After years of releasing live albums, Kaukonen felt it was time to record a new electric studio album with the band when his current label for his solo work, Red House Records, was interested.  Kaukonen started by writing one song, but with deadlines set and being locked in to studio time with the band, he collaborated and ended up writing six songs for the album. The band used Levon Helm's studio where Kaukonen had recorded his previous solo album, River of Time.  For the new album, Kaukonen decided to take the approach he used with Jefferson Airplane, letting others work out the charts for the rhythm section and concentrating on the lead guitar lines.  Also to reflect back to Jefferson Airplane's style, Teresa Williams recorded harmony vocals similar to Grace Slick's on several tracks.

Track listing

Personnel

Hot Tuna
Jorma Kaukonen – vocals, acoustic guitar, electric guitar
Jack Casady – bass
Barry Mitterhoff – electric mandolin, acoustic mandolin
Skoota Warner – drums

Additional musicians
Larry Campbell – electric guitar, acoustic guitar, pedal steel guitar, fiddle, organ, vocals
Teresa Williams – vocals

Production
Larry Campbell – producer
Justin Guip – engineer
David Glasser – mastering
Kevin Morgan – cover art

Charts

References

2011 albums
Albums produced by Larry Campbell (musician)
Hot Tuna albums
Red House Records albums